Stylida railway station is a railway station in Lamia, Greece. The station opened 1905, along with the rest of the line. It is served by Regional services to Leianokladi and Stylida.

History
The station opened 1905, along with the rest of the line. In 1920 the line became part of the Hellenic State Railways. In 1971, the Hellenic State Railways was reorganised into the OSE taking over responsibilities for most for Greece's rail infrastructure. However, by 1970 the regular passenger itineraries from Piraeus and Athens to Lamia and Stylida were suspended, and only the periodic summer excursion itineraries for the transport of bathers to the beach of Agia Marina and the commercial itineraries remained. In 1991, the line Athens Leianokladi-Lamia-Stylida is reopened with passenger trains and freight services. 

In December 2009, the following list of passenger cities was recorded on tickets from the metropolitan (to Fthiotida) Lamia railway station: Athens, Thessaloniki, Larissa, Katerini, Livadeia, Platy, Tithorea, Oinoi, Agios Stefanos, Thebes, Volos, Palaiofarsalos, Aeginio, Amphikleia, Bralos, Domokos, Thaumakos, Leptokarya and Kalambaka.

In 2011 the passenger operation of the line is transformed into a suburban line with 12 pairs of routes, 7 between Leianokladi-Lamia-Stylida and the remaining 5 between Leianokladi-Lamia. This connecting bus connected the OSE agency in Lamia with the Leianokladi station. In 2017 OSE's passenger transport sector was privatised as TrainOSE, currently a wholly-owned subsidiary of Ferrovie dello Stato Italiane infrastructure, including stations, remained under the control of OSE. On 16 March 2020, in the midst of the 2020 coronavirus pandemic, it was decided to suspend services (trains and bus lines) temporarily. On 1 July 2020, the railway line reopened with the measures envisaged for the coronavirus. In July 2022, the station began being served by Hellenic Train, the rebranded TranOSE

Facilities
The station has waiting rooms and staffed booking office within the original brick-built station building. The station has a buffet. Basic shelters are located on Platform 2, and digital display screens on both platforms. There is a taxi rank in the forecourt, with a postbox at the front entrance. However, there is no onsite parking at the station, with only parking within walking disance of teh station.

Services
It is served by Regional services to Leianokladi and Stylida. The station sees around 12 trains per day.

Station layout

See also
Railway stations in Greece
Hellenic Railways Organization
Hellenic Train

References

External links
 Lamia Station - National Railway Network Greek Travel Pages

Railway stations in Central Greece
Railway stations opened in 1905
Buildings and structures in Phthiotis